Article 7 of the European Convention on Human Rights sets limits on criminalisation, forbidding ex post facto criminalisation by signatory countries.

Text

Case law
Kokkinakis v. Greece (no violation found, 8:1)
Vassili Kononov (no violation found, 14:3)
Nikola Jorgic (no violation found, unanimously)
Nikolay Tess (2008 - decision on admissibility postponed)
Mykolas Burokevičius (no violation found, unanimously)
Handyside v United Kingdom (no violation found)
Maktouf and Damjanović v. Bosnia and Herzegovina (2013; violation found, unanimously)

Other judgements involving Article 7
Ines Del Rio: Case of the Parot doctrine.

Literature

References

 
7